Eyes Without a Face is a 1960 French-language horror film co-written and directed by Georges Franju. A French-Italian co-production, the film stars Pierre Brasseur and Alida Valli. Based on the novel of the same name by Jean Redon, it revolves around a plastic surgeon who is determined to perform a face transplant on his daughter, who was disfigured in a car accident. During the film's production, consideration was given to the standards of European censors by setting the right tone, minimizing gore and eliminating the mad scientist character. Although Eyes Without a Face was cleared by censors, its release in Europe caused controversy nevertheless. Critical reaction ranged from praise to disgust.

In the United States, an edited and dubbed version of the film, titled The Horror Chamber of Dr. Faustus, was released in 1962 as a double feature with The Manster. The film's initial critical reception was not overtly positive, but subsequent theatrical and home video re-releases improved its reputation. Modern critics praise Eyes Without a Face for its poetic nature as well as for being an influence on other filmmakers.

Plot 
At night just outside Paris, a woman drives along a riverbank and dumps a corpse in the river. After the body is recovered, Dr. Génessier identifies the remains as those of his missing daughter, Christiane, whose face was horribly disfigured in an automobile accident that occurred before her disappearance, for which he was responsible. Dr. Génessier lives in a large mansion, which is adjacent to his clinic, with numerous caged German Shepherds and other large dogs.

Following Christiane's funeral, Dr. Génessier and his assistant Louise, the woman who had disposed of the dead body earlier, return home where the real Christiane is hidden (it is explained that Louise is deathlessly loyal to Génessier because he repaired her own badly damaged face, leaving only a barely noticeable scar she covers with a pearl choker). The body belonged to a young woman who died following Dr. Génessier's unsuccessful attempt to graft her face onto his daughter's. Dr. Génessier promises to restore Christiane's face and insists that she wear a mask to cover her disfigurement. After her father leaves the room, Christiane calls her fiancé Jacques Vernon, who works with Dr. Génessier at his clinic, but hangs up without saying a word.

Louise lures a young Swiss girl named Edna Grüber to Génessier's home. Génessier chloroforms Edna and takes her into his secret laboratory. Christiane secretly watches her father and Louise carry Edna to the lab, and then goes to tenderly caress the dogs her father keeps caged, who eagerly accept her love, and are unaffected by her appearance.

Dr. Génessier performs heterograft surgery, removing Edna's face. The doctor successfully grafts the skin onto his daughter's face and holds the heavily bandaged and faceless Edna against her will. Edna escapes, but falls to her death from an upstairs window. After disposing of Edna's corpse, Génessier notices flaws on Christiane's face. Her face grows worse within days; the new tissue is being rejected and she must resort to wearing her mask again. Christiane again phones Jacques and this time says his name, but the phone call is interrupted by Louise.

Jacques reports the call to the police, who have been investigating the disappearance of several young women with blue eyes and similar facial characteristics. The police have gained a lead concerning a woman who wears a pearl choker, whom Jacques recognizes as Louise. Inspector Parot, an officer investigating Edna's disappearance, hires a young woman named Paulette Mérodon (recently arrested for shoplifting) to help investigate by checking herself into Génessier's clinic. After being declared healthy, Paulette leaves for Paris and is promptly picked up by Louise, who delivers her to Dr. Génessier. Génessier is about to begin surgery on Paulette when Louise informs him that the police want to see him.

While the doctor talks with the police, Christiane, who has long been disenchanted with her father's experiments, while slowly losing her sanity from guilt and isolation, frees Paulette and murders Louise by stabbing her in the neck. She also frees the dogs and doves that her father uses for experiments. Dr. Génessier dismisses the police (who readily accept his explanations) and returns to his lab, where an abandoned German Shepherd he had only recently obtained for his experiments attacks him, inciting the other dogs to follow suit—maddened by pain and confinement, they maul him to death, disfiguring his face in the process. Christiane, unmoved by her father's death, walks slowly into the woods outside Génessier's house with one of the freed doves in her hands.

Cast 
 Pierre Brasseur as Doctor Génessier,  physician and father of Christiane. Génessier experiments on his pet dogs and performs heterograft surgeries on women to try and restore the face of his daughter Christiane. Brasseur previously worked with director Georges Franju in the drama, La Tête contre les murs (1958), again in a leading role playing a doctor.
 Édith Scob as Christiane Génessier, Doctor Génessier's daughter. Christiane's face was damaged in a car accident caused by her father. For most of the film, her face is covered by a stiff mask that resembles her face before the accident. Like Brasseur, Scob was also cast by Franju in La Tête Contre les Murs, but in a  minor role. Scob later worked with Franju on four other films.
 Alida Valli as Louise, a woman who is Génessier's assistant, kidnaps young women, assists him in the laboratory and acts as a surrogate mother to Christiane. Louise aids Génessier partly because of his help in restoring her damaged face in events that happened before the film begins. 
 François Guérin as Jacques Vernon, a student of Génessier and Christiane's fiancé. Jacques is unaware of Doctor Génessier's criminal activity and believes Christiane is dead. After receiving a phone call from Christiane, he helps the police in investigating the crime. 
 Juliette Mayniel as Edna Grüber, a young woman who becomes a victim of Doctor Génessier's experiments after being befriended by Louise in Paris. Edna is the first woman whose face is successfully transplanted to Christiane. While recovering from the surgery, she attacks Louise and then leaps from a window at Génessier's home and dies.
 Alexandre Rignault as Inspector Parot, a police inspector investigating the disappearances of Génessier's victims. Parot ultimately discovers that all of the missing girls have similar features.
 Béatrice Altariba as Paulette Mérodon, a young woman who is taken into police custody after being caught shoplifting. Due to a resemblance with the women Génessier has kidnapped, she is informed by Parot that the charges against her will be dropped if she checks into Génessier's clinic. She is subsequently released and kidnapped to have her face transplanted, but is saved by Christiane before Génessier is able to perform surgery on her.

Production 
At the time, modern horror films had not been attempted by French film makers until producer Jules Borkon decided to tap into the horror market. Borkon bought the rights to the Redon novel and offered the directorial role to one of the founders of Cinémathèque Française, Franju, who was directing his first non-documentary feature La Tête contre les murs (1958). Franju had grown up during the French silent-film era when filmmakers such as Georges Méliès and Louis Feuillade were making fantastique-themed films, and he relished the opportunity to contribute to the genre. Franju felt the story was not a horror film; rather, he described his vision of the film as one of "anguish... it's a quieter mood than horror... more internal, more penetrating. It's horror in homeopathic doses."

To avoid problems with European censors, Borkon cautioned Franju not to include too much blood (which would upset French censors), refrain from showing animals getting tortured (which would upset English censors) and leave out mad-scientist characters (which would upset German censors). All three of these were part of the novel, presenting a challenge to find the right tone for presenting these story elements in the film. First, working with Claude Sautet who was also serving as first assistant director and who laid out the preliminary screenplay, Franju hired the writing team of Boileau-Narcejac (Pierre Boileau and Thomas Narcejac) who had written novels adapted as Henri-Georges Clouzot's Les Diaboliques (1955) and Alfred Hitchcock's Vertigo (1958). The writers shifted the novel's focus from Doctor Génessier's character to that of his daughter, Christiane; this shift revealed the doctor's character in a more positive and understandable light and helped to avoid the censorship restrictions.

For his production staff, Franju enlisted people with whom he had previously worked on earlier projects. Cinematographer Eugen Schüfftan, best remembered for developing the Schüfftan process, was chosen to render the visuals of the film. Schüfftan had worked with Franju on La Tête Contre les Murs (1958). Film historian David Kalat called Shüfftan "the ideal choice to illustrate Franju's nightmares". French composer Maurice Jarre created the haunting score for the film. Jarre had also previously worked with Franju on his film La Tête Contre les Murs (1958). Modern critics have observed the film's two imposing musical themes, a jaunty carnival-esque waltz (featured while Louise picks up young women for Doctor Génessier) and a lighter, sadder piece for Christiane.

Release 

Eyes Without a Face completed filming in 1959, and was premiered in Paris on 2 March 1960. Although it passed through the European censors, the film caused controversy on its release in Europe. The French news magazine L'Express commented that the audience "dropped like flies" during the heterografting scene. During the film's showing at the 1960 Edinburgh Film Festival, seven audience members fainted, to which director Franju responded, "Now I know why Scotsmen wear skirts."

For the American release in 1962, the film was edited, dubbed into English, and re-titled The Horror Chamber of Dr. Faustus. Edits in the Dr. Faustus version removed parts of the heterografting scene as well as scenes showing Doctor Génessier's more human side, such as his loving care for a small child at his clinic. The distributors recognized the artistic merit of the film and played up that element in promotion with an advertisement quoting the London Observers positive statements about the film and mentioned its showing at the Edinburgh Film Festival. This was in contrast to the presentation of the secondary feature, The Manster (1962), which mainly focused on the carny-show aspect with its "two-headed monster" and "Invasion from outer space by two-headed creature killer". Eyes Without a Face had a very limited initial run and there was little commentary from the American mainstream press.

Reception 
On the film's initial release, the French critics' general response was moderate, ranging from mild enthusiasm to general disdain or disappointment, claiming it to be either a repetition of German expressionism or simply a disappointment of the director's leap from documentary filmmaker to a genre film-maker claiming the film to be in a "minor genre, quite unworthy of his abilities". Franju responded to these comments claiming the film was his attempt to get the minor genre to be taken seriously. In England, Isabel Quigly, film critic for The Spectator, called it "the sickest film since I started film criticism", while a reviewer who admitted that she liked the film was nearly fired. A review in Variety was negative, noting specifically that the "stilted acting, asides to explain characters and motivations, and a repetition of effects lose the initial impact" and an "unclear progression and plodding direction give [the film] an old-fashioned air". The English Monthly Film Bulletin was of the opinion that "when a director as distinguished as Georges Franju makes a horror film...one cannot but feel tempted to search for symbols, an allegory, layers, or interpretation. Unhappily there is practically nothing in this inept work to offer any encouragement for doing so." The review said there was "a strange and poetic opening" and Schuftan's "haunting camerawork allies itself perfectly to Maurice Jarre's obsessive score" while" Brasseur and Valli were "sadly wasted" and that they "do what they can with almost non-existent characters".

Eyes Without a Face received a theatrical re-release in September 1986 in conjunction with retrospectives at the National Film Theatre in London and at the Cinémathèque Française for the film archive's 50th anniversary in France. As Franju was the archive's co-founder, the Cinémathèque Française celebrated by presenting the director's back catalogue. With the renewed interest, the film's critical reputation began to be re-evaluated. French critics' response to the film was significantly more positive than it was on its original release, with former editor-in-chief of Cahiers du cinéma Serge Daney calling the film "a marvel".

The film was re-released in its original and uncut form to American theaters on 31 October 2003. On Rotten Tomatoes, Eyes Without a Face has an approval rating of 96%, with an average rating of 8.4/10. The critic consensus says "A horrific tale of guilt and obsession, Eyes Without a Face is just as chilling and poetic today as it was when it was first released". Metacritic reports that the film has an weighted average of 90 out of 100, indicating "universal acclaim"  The reviewers commented on the film's poetic nature and noted the strong influence of French poet and filmmaker Jean Cocteau. Jonathan Rosenbaum of the Chicago Reader praised the film, referring to it as "absurd and as beautiful as a fairy tale". J. Hoberman of The Village Voice declared the film "a masterpiece of poetic horror and tactful, tactile brutality". The Encyclopedia of Horror Films agreed with the assertion of Cocteau's influence, stating that "Franju invests [the film] with a weird poetry in which the influence of Cocteau is unmistakable". David Edelstein, writing for Slate, commented that "the storyline is your standard obsessed-mad-doctor saga, one step above a Poverty Row Bela Lugosi feature ... [b]ut it's Lugosi by way of Cocteau and Ionesco". In the 2010s, Time Out polled authors, directors, actors and critics who had worked in the horror genre to vote for their top horror films. Time Out placed Eyes Without a Face at number 34 on the top 100.

Soundtrack 

In February 2005, the French soundtrack record label Play Time released the soundtrack on compact disc along with other soundtracks performed by Jarre. This also includes soundtracks from other Franju films including La Tête contre les Murs and Thérèse Desqueyroux.

Legacy 
The film has influenced other European films since its initial release. Spanish director Jesús Franco created films throughout his career that were influenced by the film. Franco's first such film was the Spanish/French co-production Gritos en la noche (1962). Franco's version of the story concerns the efforts of a mad surgeon, Dr. Orloff, to reconstruct the face of his disfigured daughter Melissa. Inspector Edgar Tanner investigates Orloff using his girlfriend, Wanda Bronsky, as an undercover spy. Franco followed the film with several sequels to Gritos en la noche. He made one more film strongly influenced by the Franju film, Faceless (1988). Faceless has a similar plot involving beautiful women who are abducted by Dr. Flamand's (Helmut Berger) female assistant and kept hostage. The doctor uses the skin of the women to perform plastic surgery on his disfigured sister, but the experiments leave the victims mutilated and dead. The Italian film Atom Age Vampire (1961) was also influenced by Eyes Without a Face with a doctor attempting to take the faces of other women to repair his daughter's face. These homages are seen in the plot line of a police lieutenant who is investigating the circumstances behind the death of a young girl whose body has scars around the eyes. The lieutenant's investigation eventually leads him to a plastic surgery clinic, a similar plot motivation to Eyes Without a Face. The British film Corruption (1968), starring Peter Cushing, adds a new variation to the theme: a surgeon tries to restore his fiancée's beauty by repeatedly treating her with fluids extracted from the pituitary glands of murdered female victims. Spanish director Pedro Almodóvar has stated his film The Skin I Live In (2011), which features a mad scientist who performs skin grafts and surgeries on an unwilling victim, was heavily influenced by Eyes Without a Face.

American film director John Carpenter has suggested that the film inspired the idea of a featureless mask for the Michael Myers character in the slasher film series Halloween. Carpenter recalls that the film crew "didn't have any money to make a mask. It was originally written the way you see it, in other words, it's a pale mask with human features, almost featureless. I don't know why I wrote that down, why Debra [Hill] and I decided on that, maybe it was because of an old movie called Eyes Without a Face."

DVD film reviews have suggested the film influenced director John Woo; critics have compared the graphic detail of the face transplant scene in Woo's action film Face/Off (1997) to the face transplant scene in Eyes Without a Face. Another resemblance is Woo's use of white doves in his films that is similar to the character Christiane's dove-laden escape in the film's finale.

In 2001, on VH1 Storytellers, singer Billy Idol cited the film as giving him the idea for his song "Eyes Without a Face". The song, which has the film's French title ("Les yeux sans visage") as a recurring line in the chorus, takes the father-daughter relationship from the film and recasts it as the deteriorated relationship between the narrator and his lover. The song became Idol's first top-10 hit in the U.S.

Home video 
Eyes Without a Face was released on VHS on 9 January 2001 by Kino Video and on DVD on 19 October 2004 by the Criterion Collection. The DVD also contains Georges Franju's first documentary Blood of the Beasts (1949), a depiction of a French slaughterhouse. A Region 2 release of Eyes Without a Face was released on 21 April 2008 by Second Sight Films. A Region 4 edition of the film was released on 2 July 2007 by Umbrella Entertainment. The disc also included Franju's documentary Blood of the Beasts. In 2013, the Criterion Collection released the film on Blu-ray, this time transferred directly from the camera negative.

See also 

 1960 in film
 French films of 1960
 Italian films of 1960
 List of French-language films
 List of horror films of 1960

References

Bibliography 

 
 
 
 
 }
 }
 }

External links 
 
 
 
 
 
 Eyes Without a Face: The Unreal Reality an essay by David Kalat at the Criterion Collection

1960 films
1960 horror films
Films about surgeons
Films scored by Maurice Jarre
Films based on French novels
Films based on horror novels
Films directed by Georges Franju
Films set in country houses
Films set in France
French black-and-white films
1960s French-language films
Gothic horror films
Italian black-and-white films
Italian horror films
Mad scientist films
Lux Film films
Works about plastic surgery
French serial killer films
1960s Italian films
1960s French films